Stanground North is an unparished area in the Peterborough district, in the ceremonial county of Cambridgeshire, England. The 2001 census recorded a population of zero. The parish, which covered open fields on a flood plain of the River Nene.

History 
The parish was originally created on 1 October 1905, when Stanground parish was divided into two (Stanground South becoming part of Old Fletton urban district), having hitherto been the only parish to still cross a county border.

From then until 1974, it formed the only parish in Thorney Rural District apart from Thorney, being in Isle of Ely until 1965 and then Huntingdon and Peterborough. In 1974 it became part of the Peterborough district of Cambridgeshire.

It had a peak population of 43 in the census of 1921.

On 1 April 2004 the parish was abolished and became an unparished area.

References

Unparished areas in Cambridgeshire
Former civil parishes in Cambridgeshire
Geography of Peterborough